The 14005 / 14006 Lichchavi Express is an Express train belonging to Indian Railways – Northern Railway zone that runs between  & Sitamarhi in India.

It operates as train number 14006 from Anand Vihar Terminal to Sitamarhi and as train number 14005 in the reverse direction, serving the states of Bihar, Uttar Pradesh & Delhi.

It is named after the Licchavi (kingdom) – (also Lichchhavi, Lichavi) which was an ancient kingdom in Nepal, which existed in the Kathmandu Valley.

Coaches

The 14006 / 05 Anand Vihar Terminal–Sitamarhi Lichchavi Express has 1HA1 composite coach, 2 AC 2 tier, 6 AC 3 tier, 7 Sleeper class, 5 General Unreserved & 1 EOG coaches. In addition, it carries a pantry car.
 
As is customary with most train services in India, coach composition may be amended at the discretion of Indian Railways depending on demand.

Service

Mostly, this train runs late and cancelled in winter.

Routing

Some of the important stations during the journey are Aligarh, Kanpur, Allahabad, Varanasi, Dadri, Sonpur, Muzaffarpur.

Traction

As the route is yet to be fully electrified, a Ghaziabad-based WAP-5 / WAP-7 locomotive   hauls the trains from Anand Vihar Terminal up to  handling over to a Jhansi-based WDM-3A / WDM-3D locomotive.  which then hauls the train for the remainder of its journey until Sitamarhi Junction.
But right now since the regular trains are not running, so special trains run fully with electric locomotive from end to end.

Operation

14006 Anand Vihar Terminal–Sitamarhi Lichchavi Express runs from Anand Vihar Terminal on a daily basis reaching Sitamarhi the next day.
14005 Sitamarhi–Anand Vihar Terminal Lichchavi Express runs from Sitamarhi on a daily basis reaching Anand Vihar Terminal the next day.

Accident
In an accident due to dense fog on 2 January 2010, the Lichchavi Express collided with the stationary Magadh Express train at the station near the town of Etawah, about 170 miles (270 kilometers) southwest of Lucknow. Ten people, including the driver of one of the trains, were injured.

References 

 http://www.holidayiq.com/railways/lichchavi-express-14005-train.html
 https://www.youtube.com/watch?v=oTehGsutlsk
 https://www.flickr.com/photos/wap5holic/5089268419/
 http://indianexpress.com/article/cities/lucknow/guard-pulls-out-loses-family-in-other-mishap/
 http://www.thehindu.com/todays-paper/10-killed-as-trains-collide-in-dense-fog-in-up/article676121.ece

External links

Transport in Delhi
Named passenger trains of India
Rail transport in Bihar
Rail transport in Uttar Pradesh
Rail transport in Delhi
Express trains in India